We Thieves Are Honourable (Spanish:Los ladrones somos gente honrada) may refer to:
 We Thieves Are Honourable (play), a play by Enrique Jardiel Poncela
 We Thieves Are Honourable (1942 film), a Spanish film directed by Ignacio F. Iquino 
 We Thieves Are Honourable (1956 film), a Spanish remake directed by Pedro Luis Ramírez